Skirveggen (1381 m.) is the highest mountain in Vegglifjell. The summit lies in Tinn commune in Telemark, but the border with Nore og Uvdal commune in Buskerud is only one hundred metres north-east. The mountain has a steep east flank, the other sides are gently sloped. It has a flat summit, where the actual high point is difficult to make out.

References

Mountains of Vestfold og Telemark
Mountains of Viken